Alexander Denton may refer to:

 Alexander Denton (Royalist) (died 1645), English politician who sat in the House of Commons variously between 1625 and 1644
 Alexander Denton (judge) (1679–1740), English Member of Parliament and Justice of the Common Pleas
 Alexander Denton (1654–1698), Member of Parliament for Buckingham, 1690–1698